Maksim Antonovich Lazutkin (born 25 March 1999) is a Russian football player.

Club career
He made his debut in the Russian Football National League for FC Tambov on 6 October 2018 in a game against FC Shinnik Yaroslavl as an 86th-minute substitute for Valeriu Ciupercă.

References

External links
 Profile by Russian Football National League

1999 births
Footballers from Tambov
Living people
Russian footballers
Association football midfielders
FC Tambov players